Luis Daniel Silva de Francisco (born in Habana, 9 October 1978), known professionally as Luis Silva, is a Cuban comedian known for his television program Vivir del cuento (roughly live by the story") and his character Pánfilo.

In March 2016, he filmed a sketch with US President Barack Obama in which Pánfilo calls the White House and talks with Obama about his visit to Cuba.

Luis Silva has also hosted the "Lucas Awards" and has played his character "Pánfilo" in other Cuban comedy shows such as "La Hiena Ilustrada".

References 

1978 births
Living people
Cuban male comedians